Tod A. Maitland (born 1957) is an American sound engineer. He has been nominated for five Academy Awards in the category Best Sound. He has worked on more than 100 films since 1978.

Selected filmography
 Born on the Fourth of July (1989)
 JFK (1991)
 Seabiscuit (2003)
 Life of Crime (2014)
 The Irishman (2019)
 Joker (2019)

References

External links

1957 births
Living people
American audio engineers
Best Sound BAFTA Award winners
Engineers from New York City
People from New York City